Bezverkhovo is the name of three rural localities in Russia:

Bezverkhovo, Moscow Oblast, a hamlet in Solnechnogorsky District of Moscow Oblast
Bezverkhovo, Primorsky Krai, a village in Khasansky District of Primorsky Krai
Bezverkhovo, Yaroslavl Oblast, a hamlet in Pervomaysky District of Yaroslavl Oblast